Mitzi Miller is an American writer and magazine editor. She was editor-in-chief of Jet from 2011 to 2014, then of Ebony from 2014 to 2015. She also co-authored the 2006 novel The Vow, adapted by Nzingha Stewart as 2015 Lifetime movie With This Ring. In 2015, she became head of development for Rob Hardy's production company, Rainforest Entertainment. In 2014, she was named to the number 16 spot on The Root 100 list.

References

Living people
American magazine editors
21st-century American novelists
African-American novelists
American women novelists
American women non-fiction writers
21st-century American non-fiction writers
21st-century American women writers
Women magazine editors
Year of birth missing (living people)
21st-century African-American women writers
21st-century African-American writers